Argyre Planitia  is a plain located within the impact basin Argyre in the southern highlands of Mars. Its name comes from a map produced by Giovanni Schiaparelli in 1877; it refers to Argyre, a mythical island of silver in Greek mythology.

The basin was formed by a giant impact during the Late Heavy Bombardment of the early Solar System, approximately 3.9 billion years ago, and may be one of the best preserved ancient impact basins from that period. Argyre is surrounded by rugged massifs which form concentric and radial patterns around the basin. Several mountain ranges are present, some of these mountain ranges include Charitum and Nereidum Montes.

Past water flows
Four large Noachian epoch channels lie radial to the basin. Three of these channels (Surius Vallis, Dzígai Vallis, and Pallacopas Vallis) flowed into Argyre from the south and east through the rim mountains. The fourth, Uzboi Vallis, appears to have flowed out from the basin's north rim to the Chryse region and may have drained a lake of melting ice within the basin. A smaller outflow channel named Nia Valles is relatively fresh-looking, and probably formed during the early Amazonian after the major fluvial and lacustrine episodes had finished.

The original basin floor is buried with friable, partially deflated layered material that may be lake sediment. No inner rings are visible; however, isolated massifs within the basin may be remnants of an inner ring.

Past habitability
After the formation of the impact basin, heat from the impact event along with geothermal heating may have allowed for liquid water to persist for many millions of years. The lake's volume could have been equal to that of Earth's Mediterranean Sea. The basin would have supported a regional environment favorable for the origin and the persistence of life.  This region shows a great deal of evidence of glacial activity with flow features, crevasse-like fractures, drumlins, eskers, tarns, arêtes, cirques, horns, U-shaped valleys, and terraces.  Because of the shapes of Argyre sinuous ridges, the authors agree with previous publications in which they are eskers.

Based on morphometrical and geomorphological analysis of the Argyre eskers and their immediate surroundings, it was suggested that they formed beneath an approximately 2 km thick, stagnant (i.e., stationary) ice sheet around 3.6 billion years ago. This stagnant body of ice might have resembled a Piedmont-style glacier comparable to today's Malaspina Glacier in Alaska.

Gallery

Interactive Mars map

See also
 Argyre quadrangle 
 Geography of Mars 
 Lakes on Mars
 List of plains on Mars
 Uzboi-Landon-Morava (ULM)

Notes

References

External links
 Argyre Planitia map at Google Mars
   Lakes on Mars - Nathalie Cabrol (SETI Talks)
 

Plains on Mars
Argyre quadrangle